Rosemary Clooney (May 23, 1928 – June 29, 2002) was an American singer and actress. She came to prominence in the early 1950s with the song "Come On-a My House", which was followed by other pop numbers such as "Botch-a-Me", "Mambo Italiano", "Tenderly", "Half as Much", "Hey There", "This Ole House", and "Sway". She also had success as a jazz vocalist. Clooney's career languished in the 1960s, partly because of problems related to depression and drug addiction, but revived in 1977, when her White Christmas co-star Bing Crosby asked her to appear with him at a show marking his 50th anniversary in show business. She continued recording until her death in 2002.

Early life

Rosemary Clooney was born in Maysville, Kentucky, the daughter of Marie Frances (née Guilfoyle) and Andrew Joseph Clooney. She was one of five children. Her father was of Irish and German descent, and her mother was of English and Irish ancestry. She was raised Catholic. When Clooney was 15, her mother and brother Nick moved to California. She and her sister Betty remained with their father. The family resided in the John Brett Richeson House in the late 1940s.

Rosemary and Betty became entertainers, whereas Nick became a newsman and television broadcaster (some of her children, including Miguel Ferrer and Rafael Ferrer, and her nephew, George Clooney, also became respected actors and entertainers). In 1945, the Clooney sisters won a spot on Cincinnati's radio station WLW as singers. Rosemary and Betty sang in a duo for much of Rosemary’s early career.

Career

Clooney signed with Columbia and cut her first record with Tony Pastor's big band in 1947, "I'm Sorry I Didn't Say Sorry" b/w "The Lady From Twenty-Nine Palms." She cut 14 sides with the Pastor band before making her solo recording debut in mid-1949 with "Bargain Day" b/w "Cabaret." In 1950–51, she was a regular on the radio and television versions of Songs For Sale on CBS. In early 1951, she had a minor hit with "Beautiful Brown Eyes", but her record of "Come On-a My House" four months later, produced by Mitch Miller, became her first big chart hit. Clooney recounted in her memoir that she despised the song, but pop singers in that era seldom had a choice in the material they recorded and she risked being dropped from Columbia if she refused to record it. Clooney recorded several duets with Marlene Dietrich and appeared in the early 1950s on Faye Emerson's Wonderful Town series on CBS. She also did several guest appearances on the Arthur Godfrey radio show, when it was sponsored by Lipton Tea. They did duets as he played his ukulele, and other times, she would sing one of her latest hits.

In 1954, she starred, along with Bing Crosby, Danny Kaye, and Vera-Ellen, in the movie White Christmas. She starred, in 1956, in a half-hour syndicated television musical-variety show, The Rosemary Clooney Show, which featured The Hi-Lo's singing group and Nelson Riddle's orchestra. The following year, the show moved to NBC prime time as The Lux Show Starring Rosemary Clooney, but lasted only one season. The new show featured the singing group The Modernaires and Frank DeVol's orchestra. In later years, Clooney often appeared with Bing Crosby on television, such as in the 1957 special The Edsel Show, and the two friends made a concert tour of Ireland together. On November 21, 1957, she appeared on NBC's The Ford Show, Starring Tennessee Ernie Ford, a frequent entry in the "Top 20" and featuring a musical group called "The Top Twenty". In 1960, Clooney and Crosby co-starred in a 20-minute CBS radio program that aired before the midday news each weekday.

The last major chart hit Clooney had was "I've Grown Accustomed To Your Face", released in May 1956, at which point rock-and-roll was quickly driving established pop singers from the charts.

Clooney left Columbia Records in 1958, doing a number of recordings for MGM Records and then some for Coral Records. Finally, toward the end of 1958, she signed with RCA Victor, where she recorded until 1963. In 1964, she was signed to Reprise Records, and in 1965 to Dot Records.

In 1976, Clooney signed with United Artists Records for two albums. Beginning in 1977, she recorded an album every year for the Concord Jazz record label, a schedule which continued until her death. This was in contrast to most of her generation of singers, who had long since stopped recording regularly by then. In the late 1970s and early 1980s, Clooney did television commercials for Coronet brand paper towels, during which she sang a memorable jingle that went, "Extra value is what you get, when you buy Coro-net." Clooney sang a duet with Wild Man Fischer on "It's a Hard Business" in 1986, and in 1994, she sang a duet of Green Eyes with Barry Manilow in his 1994 album, Singin' with the Big Bands.

In 1995, Clooney guest-starred in the NBC television medical drama ER (starring her nephew, George Clooney); for her performance, she received a Primetime Emmy Award nomination for Outstanding Guest Actress in a Drama Series. On January 27, 1996, Clooney appeared on Garrison Keillor's Prairie Home Companion radio program. She sang "When October Goes"—lyrics by Johnny Mercer and music by Barry Manilow (after Mercer's death)—from Manilow's 1984 album 2:00 AM Paradise Cafe, and discussed the excellence of Manilow the musician.

Clooney was also awarded Society of Singers Lifetime Achievement Award in 1998. In 1999, she founded the Rosemary Clooney Music Festival, held annually in Maysville, her hometown. She performed at the festival every year until her death. Proceeds benefit the restoration of the Russell Theater in Maysville, where Clooney's first film, The Stars Are Singing, premiered in 1953.

She received the Grammy Lifetime Achievement Award in 2002.

Personal life

Clooney was married twice to Puerto Rican movie star José Ferrer, 16 years her senior. Clooney first married Ferrer on July 13, 1953, in Durant, Oklahoma. They moved to Santa Monica, California, in 1954, and then to Los Angeles in 1958. Together, the couple had five children; son Miguel Ferrer Clooney also became an actor. Clooney and Ferrer divorced for the first time in 1961.

Clooney remarried Ferrer on November 22, 1964, in Los Angeles. However, the marriage again crumbled while Ferrer was carrying on an affair with the woman who would become his last wife, Stella Magee. The couple divorced again after she found out about the affair, this time in 1967.

In 1968, her relationship with a drummer ended after two years. At this time, following a tour, she became increasingly dependent on tranquilizers and sleeping pills.

She joined the presidential campaign of close friend Robert F. Kennedy, and heard the shots when he was assassinated on June 5, 1968. A month later, she had a nervous breakdown onstage in Reno, Nevada, where she began shouting insults at her audience. She was hospitalized and remained in psychoanalytic therapy for eight years.

Her sister Betty died suddenly of a brain aneurysm in 1976. She subsequently started a foundation in memory of and named for her sister. During this time, she also wrote her first autobiography, This for Remembrance: the Autobiography of Rosemary Clooney, an Irish-American Singer, written in collaboration with Raymond Strait and published by Playboy Press in 1977. She chronicled her unhappy early life, her career as a singer, her marriage to Ferrer, her mental breakdown in 1968, and the diagnosis of bipolar disorder that seriously disrupted her career, concluding with her comeback as a singer and her happiness. Her good friend Bing Crosby wrote the introduction. Katherine Coker adapted the book for Jackie Cooper, who produced and directed the television movie, Rosie: the Rosemary Clooney Story (1982) starring Sondra Locke (who lip synced Clooney's songs), Penelope Milford as Betty, and Tony Orlando as José Ferrer. The 1944-born Locke was 38 at the time, just 16 years Clooney's junior, yet playing her from 17 to 40. Orlando and Locke were the same age, though the real Ferrer was 16 years older than Clooney.

In 1983, Rosemary and her brother Nick co-chaired the Betty Clooney Foundation for the Brain-Injured, addressing the needs of survivors of cognitive disabilities caused by strokes, tumors, and brain damage from trauma or age.

In 1997, she married her longtime friend and a former dancer, Dante DiPaolo at St. Patrick's Church in Maysville, Kentucky.

In 1999, Clooney published her second autobiography, Girl Singer: An Autobiography, describing her battles with addiction to prescription drugs for depression, and how she lost and then regained a fortune. "I'd call myself a sweet singer with a big band sensibility," she wrote.

Lung cancer and death
A longtime heavy smoker, Clooney was diagnosed with lung cancer at the end of 2001. Around this time, she gave one of her last concerts in Hawaii, backed by the Honolulu Symphony Pops; her last song was "God Bless America". Her final show was at Red Bank, New Jersey's Count Basie Theatre in December 2001. Despite surgery and a long period of care following, she died six months later on June 29, 2002, at her Beverly Hills home. Her nephew, George Clooney, was a pallbearer at her funeral. She is buried at Saint Patrick's Cemetery, Maysville.

Legacy

Clooney lived for many years in Beverly Hills, California, in the house formerly owned by George and Ira Gershwin at 1019 North Roxbury Drive. It was sold to a developer after her death in 2002, and has since been demolished. In 1980, she purchased a second home on Riverside Drive in Augusta, Kentucky, near Maysville, her childhood hometown. Today, the Augusta house offers viewing of collections of her personal items and memorabilia from many of her films and singing performances.

In 2003, Rosemary Clooney was inducted into the Kentucky Women Remembered exhibit and her portrait by Alison Lyne is on permanent display in the Kentucky State Capitol's rotunda.

Also in 2003, Bette Midler, after many years apart, rejoined forces with Barry Manilow to record Bette Midler Sings the Rosemary Clooney Songbook. The album was an instant success, being certified gold by Recording Industry Association of America. One of the songbook selections, "This Ole House", became Midler's first Christian radio single shipped by Rick Hendrix and his positive music movement. The album was nominated for a Grammy the following year.

In 2005, the album Reflections of Rosemary by Debby Boone was released. Boone, who was Clooney's daughter-in-law, intended the album to be a musical portrait of Clooney, or as Boone put it: "I wanted to select songs that would give an insight into Rosemary from a family perspective".

In September 2007, a mural honoring moments from her life was painted in downtown Maysville; it highlights the 1953 premiere of The Stars are Singing and her singing career. It was painted by Louisiana muralists Robert Dafford, Herb Roe, and Brett Chigoy as part of the Maysville Floodwall Murals project. Her brother Nick Clooney spoke during the dedication for the mural, explaining various images to the crowd.

Discography

Filmography
 Tony Pastor and His Orchestra (1947 short subject)
 The Stars Are Singing (1953) as Terry Brennan
 Here Come the Girls (1953) as Daisy Crockett
 Red Garters (1954) as Calaveras Kate
 White Christmas (1954) as Betty Haynes
 Deep in My Heart (1954; cameo appearance) as Performer in 'That Midnight Girl'
 Conquest of Space (1955) as Musical Number (uncredited) (archive footage)
 The Joker's Wild (1968, TV Movie)
 Twilight Theater (1982, TV Movie)
 Sister Margaret and the Saturday Night Ladies (1987, TV Movie) as Sarah
 Radioland Murders (1994) as Anna
 ER (1994, TV Series) as Mary Cavanaugh / 'Madame X'
 LateLine (1999, TV Series) as Special Guest Mother

Radio broadcasts

See also

 Rosemary Clooney Museum; Augusta, Kentucky

References

External links

 
 
 
 
 Rosemary Clooney Palladium page
 Clooney Discography

1928 births
2002 deaths
20th-century American actresses
20th-century American singers
20th-century American women singers
Actresses from Kentucky
American autobiographers
American contraltos
American film actresses
American jazz singers
American people of English descent
American people of German descent
American people of Irish descent
American television actresses
American women jazz singers
American women pop singers
Cabaret singers
California Democrats
Catholics from Kentucky
Columbia Records artists
Concord Records artists
Coral Records artists
Deaths from lung cancer in California
Decca Records artists
Dot Records artists
Ferrer family (acting)
Grammy Lifetime Achievement Award winners
Jazz musicians from Kentucky
Jazz musicians from New York (state)
Kentucky Democrats
Kentucky women musicians
MGM Records artists
Paramount Pictures contract players
People from Maysville, Kentucky
People with bipolar disorder
RCA Victor artists
Reprise Records artists
Singers from Kentucky
Torch singers
Traditional pop music singers
United Artists Records artists
Women autobiographers